Speaker of the National Assembly may refer to:
Speaker of the Kenyan National Assembly
Speaker of the National Assembly of Pakistan
Speaker of the South African National Assembly
Speaker of the National Assembly of Suriname
Speaker of the National Assembly of Zambia

See also
Speaker (politics)
National Assembly
President of the National Assembly (disambiguation)